Bagala may refer to:

Bagala, a clan of the Jawoyn people of northern Australia
Bágala, a town in Panama
Baghlah, also spelt bagala, a type of Arab sailing dhow
 Bagala, a social group (community) of India
Bagalamukhi, also known as Bagala, one of the mahavidyas and an aspect of Devi in Hinduism